Mstyslav Chernov (born 1985) is a Ukrainian videographer, photographer, photojournalist, filmmaker, war correspondent and novelist known for his coverage of the Revolution of Dignity, War in Donbas, including the downing of flight MH17, Syrian civil war, Battle of Mosul in Iraq, the 2022 Russian invasion of Ukraine, including the Siege of Mariupol (for this work he received the Deutsche Welle Freedom of Speech Award, the Georgiy Gongadze Award, the Knight International Journalism Awards, and the Biagio Agnes Award, Bayeux Calvados-Normandy Award, Elijah Parish Lovejoy Award, Free Media Awards, CJFE International Press Freedom Award, Royal Television Society Television Journalism Awards, at the end of 2022 was included in the nationwide Ukrainian ratings "People of the HB 2022 in the year of war" and "14 songs, photos and art objects that became symbols of Ukrainian resistance" by Forbes Ukraine, and video materials from Mariupol became the basis of the film "20 days in Mariupol", which was included in the competition program of the Sundance festival in 2023) as well as for his diverse photography exhibitions. Film won Audience Award in World Cinema Documentary category Chernov is an Associated Press journalist and the President of the Ukrainian Association of Professional Photographers (UAPF). Chernov's materials have been published and aired by multiple news outlets worldwide, including CNN, BBC, The New York Times, The Washington Post, and others. He has both won and been a finalist for prestigious awards, including the Livingston Award, Rory Peck Award, Reporters Without Borders Press Freedom Prize, and various Royal Television Society awards. Chernov has been wounded several times while working in war. He has been a member of "Ukrainian PEN" since July 2022.

Career in photography and journalism

Fine-art and documentary photography: 2005–2013 
Chernov started his career in photography in 2005, working for a local Kharkiv news agency MediaPort. He gained notoriety in 2008 when he received the 1st prize at a local photography exhibition "Kharkiv through the eyes of its inhabitants". In the same year, he had his first personal photography exhibition "Musica per somnia," conceived and organized with assistance of Yuriy Yanko, the Director of Kharkiv Philharmonic Society, who was impressed by Chernov's photographs of Sayaka Shoji, a Japanese violinist, then performing with Kharkiv Philarmonics. In 2009, Chernov won another first place award in local photo expo "Almost disappearing Kharkiv", covering crumbling examples of the city's older architecture.

Starting in 2008, Chernov worked with Chornobyl Children International, the Novick Cardiac Alliance, photographing cardiac surgeries. Chernov's transition to documentary photography continued. In 2012 he lived in Cambodia, focusing on local health care and cultural projects.
 
Meanwhile, by 2013, Chernov's work gained national recognition. His 2013 photographs landed him the first place in the Ukrainian contest "Photographer of the Year" in nomination documentary photography. In the same year, Chernov was a winner of the Pentax Awards Ukraine 2013 and Best Press Photographer, Ukraine, nomination "portrait". He photographed in over forty countries and had another personal exhibition, Rainy Season, featuring images of the Far East.

In 2013, Chernov became the President of the Ukrainian Association of Professional Photographers (UAPF). Chernov's installation art project Peeking in Windows – placing enlarged old photographs into windows of abandoned buildings – gained the attention of the national press and was repeated in subsequent years. In 2013, Chernov was invited to participate in Unframe, an international project around documentary photography.

Journalism 
In the summer of 2013, while photographing in Istanbul, Turkey, Chernov found himself in the middle of Gezi Park protests. The images of night violence impressed Chernov and triggered a shift from fine-art photography and documentary photography to conflict and war reporting.

Euromaidan 
In late 2013, Ukraine's capital Kyiv became embroiled in mass protests – Euromaidan which culminated in bloodshed, Revolution of Dignity, and the ousting of the Ukrainian president Viktor Yanukovych. Chernov photographed the action as a MediaPort and Unframe correspondent. As violence intensified, he was attacked and wounded several times. In early December 2013, pro-Yanukovych police targeted and attacked members of the press, injuring Chernov's hand with a baton, tearing up his press credentials, and destroying his photography equipment. In January 2014, ignoring Chernov's insignia that identified him as a member of the press, a pro-Yanukovych policeman deliberately threw a stun grenade into Chernov, injuring his legs and eye with shrapnel.

The events in Kyiv attracted considerable international attention. Many international reporters flocked to cover the Ukrainian Revolution which later transitioned into the annexation of Crimea and War in Donbas. Chernov provided the international reporters with local assistance, also starting as a translator and a stringer for Associated Press. Chernov's background in photography and his partnership with other reporters allowed him to polish his video filming skills and become a regular freelancer for Associated Press in May 2014.

Career with Associated Press 
By July 2014, Chernov already worked as an independent multi-format (text, photo, and video) journalist for Associated Press. Russian military intervention to Donbas had created another conflict zone in Ukraine, and Chernov covered War in Donbas in 2014, becoming one of very few journalists who reported the conflict from both sides. He was the first journalist who published the video footage from the scene after downing of Malaysia Airlines Flight 17.

On his third day working as an independent AP journalist, Malaysia Airlines Flight 17 was shot down in the area, and Chernov provided first images of the incident. Chernov's reporting played an essential role in The Associated Press' coverage of the event. For his coverage of the event, Chernov was awarded "Young Talent of the Year" Award by Royal Television Society.

In subsequent years as an AP journalist and war correspondent, Chernov covered the war in Syria and the Battle of Mosul in Iraq as well as the 2015 European migrant crisis in Greece, Macedonia, Slovenia, Croatia, Hungary, Austria, and Germany. In 2017, in Mosul, a sniper bullet pierced through Chernov's camera and stuck in his ballistic vest. Chernov's Iraqi videos were finalist entries for Rory Peck Award in 2017 and for Royal Television Society awards in 2017 and 2018.

Chernov's reports were published worldwide, including being picked up by The Independent, The Seattle Times, Military Times, Navy Times, Washington Examiner. Chernov's photographs were also published in The New York Times, The Washington Post, The Wall Street Journal, Forbes, The Guardian, Daily Telegraph, Dailymail, Le Monde, Deutsche Welle, Die Zeit, and others, and his videos were aired on BBC, Euronews, CNN, Fox News, Sky News, Al Jazeera, and others. In 2016, a Royal Television Society judge commented that "given the range, volume, and global distribution of [Chernov's] footage, there may have been days last year when we watched [Chernov's reporting] all day."

In the spring of 2020, Mstyslav Chernov worked in Libya, Syria, covering the migration crisis in Turkey. From May to July and from September to October, the course of the COVID-19 pandemic in Ukraine is filmed.

In August 2020, the journalist worked in Belarus, covering the presidential elections. After the announcement that Lukashenko was the winner of the elections, large-scale protests began. In Minsk, Chernov was captured and beaten by Belarusian law enforcement officers. The photographer lost consciousness after being beaten in the police van. He regained consciousness already in the ambulance. During protests Chernov recorded the moment when a man in a bloody shirt fell to the ground. Later it was established that this is protester Oleksandr Taraikovsky. Chernov's photo and video became incontrovertible evidence that Taraikovsky was shot at point-blank range by members of the special forces on August 10, 2020 in Minsk, while government media tried to portray the incident as something that happened due to the carelessness of a protester. After that, Chernov was deported from the country, and his accreditation was not extended.

During 2020 and 2021, he also works in Nagorno-Karabakh, Afghanistan, Lithuania, and Armenia.

In February and March 2022, during the Russian invasion of Ukraine, Chernov and the freelancer Evgeniy Maloletka, working for AP, stayed in Mariupol, which was encircled by the Russian troops, under siege, and extensively bombed, whereas the Russian Ministry of Foreign Affairs and the Defense Ministry claimed that Russia only targets military installations. Chernov and Maloletka were among the few journalists, and, according to the AP, the only international journalists in Mariupol during that period, and their photographs were extensively used by Western media to cover the situation. According to Chernov, on 11 March they were in a hospital taking photos when they were taken of the city with the assistance of Ukrainian soldiers. They managed to escape from Mariupol unharmed. On 23 May 2022 Chernov, together with Maloletka and Vasilisa Stepanenko, received the Knight International Journalism Award for their work in Mariupol, as announced by the International Center for Journalists.

20 Days in Mariupol 
From the footage which Chernov collected in Mariupol, together with the team of Frontline (PBS channel) the journalist made the documentary "20 Days in Mariupol". The film was included in the competition of Sundance Film Festival in the World Cinema Documentary Competition category. The world premiere of the film took place at the festival in January 2023. Film won Audience Award in World Cinema Documentary category. On review aggregator website Rotten Tomatoes the film has an approval rating of 100%.

Chernov's style 
Outside observers note Chernov's deep compassion to humanity that makes his imagery influential. They also note the vast spectrum of his creative work and his "exceptional eye for detail."

A Ukrainian photographer and a photography exhibition curator in Kharkiv, Volodymyr Ohloblin, commented on Chernov's work: "Mstyslav has exceptionally deep vision  it's obvious that he feels for the people on his photographs. Mstyslav has a good intuition, a rare gift, how to convey in photographs what he sees."

The Director of the European news section of Associated Press, Caro Kriel, said: "Through his involvement in some critical stories, Chernov has quickly proved himself to be a rare, multiformat journalist with an uncanny ability to develop a story in the most difficult conditions. He is a natural visual storyteller and his signature trait – compassion for humanity that suffuses almost every image – has ensured that his work has had an immediate impact."

A judge of Royal Television Society Awards commented that "[Chernov] has an exceptional eye for detail and a full range of shots across his portfolio, capturing emotion and conveying the fear and sometimes panic that was at the heart of so many news events last year."

Chernov himself believes that war should not be glamorized but pictured as is. Commenting on his own work, Chernov noted that he doesn't necessarily enjoy war journalism, but feels that he's at the right place, albeit his work might transition at some point to a different kind of photography, for example, to working for National Geographic.

The photographer believes that sometimes you have to take risks in order to take a good photo: "You have to compromise: to show what is happening, you need to be in the center of events. If you take care of yourself, you will never take a photograph of the most important thing".

Chernov prefers to work "light," carrying simpler, smaller equipment, that could always be on him and ready to shoot at all times. He works with small cameras and usually doesn't use a tripod.

Writing 
In January 2020, Chernov presented his psychological novel Dreamtime, a 500-page fiction conceived and written over an 8-year period. Alluding to aboriginal Dreamtime, the novel examines societies' collective experiences ("dreams") with war and conflict and is loosely based on real events that Chernov witnessed during the War in Donbass, the Migration crisis in Europe and others. It features four intertwined plot lines that span across vast geography from Eastern Ukraine to Southern Europe, then to Southeast Asia, yet united by a common theme of internal conflict resolution. The novel was launched in Kyiv as a focal point of a video art exhibition devoted to the role of media in creating public collective experiences. The novel was credited for its creative literary application of dreams to showcase protagonists' psyches and for its "serious" and "masterly prose.". The novel was included in the TOP books of 2020 by volunteers, writers and military journalists about the Russian-Ukrainian war according to "Army FM".

Literary expert and critic Tetyana Trofymenko believes that "The Dreamtime" is unexpectedly strong and stylistically formed prose for a debutant. Journalist and critic Yuryi Volodarsky called the novel the first large-scale literary text in Ukrainian literature in which the war in Donbas is shown from the other side of the front. "A novel for a debut is surprisingly bright, but in so many moments it is uncomfortable that it is better to ignore it. "The Dreamtime" is devoid of both the author's evaluative judgments and the transmission of "correct" views from the mouths of the characters. Chernov is first and foremost a humanist, this is evident in his prose no less than in photos from hot spots".

In September 2022, the Boston-based ASP Publishing House will release an English translation of the novel under the title “The Dreamtime”.

In 2022, the photo book "Independents" («Незалежні») was published (“Ваш автограф” publishing house), which included 144 pictures taken by 60 Ukrainian photographers over the past 30 years, from the declaration of independence to the pandemic. The author of the idea and texts was Mstyslav Chernov, the image editor was the well-known Ukrainian photographer Mykhailo Palinchak.

In October 2022, Chernov spoke on behalf of Ukraine at the 74th Frankfurt Book Fair.

Other photo projects

Project "Looking into the windows" 

Since 2013, Chernov has been implementing the "Looking into Windows" («Зазираючи у вікна») project in Kyiv.

In 2013, pre-revolutionary portraits, mostly by Kharkiv photographer Oleksiy Ivanytskyi, decorated the windows of the house on the street. Yaroslaviv Val, 15. Most of the photographs depicted people from Kharkiv, including a self-portrait of the photographer with his granddaughter. Photographer Volodymyr Ogloblin became a partner at this stage — the photos used were from his collection.

In 2014, the second part of the project was placed in the windows of the building at Shevchenko Street, 5. This stage was dedicated to the 200th anniversary of Taras Shevchenko. His portraits painted by contemporary artists of the Maidan were selected for the project.

In December 2020, the third stage of the project was the exhibition "Sleeping House" (“Сплячий будинок”) in partnership with the NGO "Renovation Map" - an installation with archival photos integrated into the windows of the "Dragon House" - an abandoned building on Taras Shevchenko Boulevard, 19. In the photo were archival portraits of Ukrainians in traditional clothes, by Ukrainian photographer Ivan Karpov. In the photos, people's eyes were "closed" with the help of computer graphics, because "people are increasingly distant from reality and plunge into the world created by media and advertising". The main element of the exhibition was a large portrait of Hryhorii Skovoroda.

Awards

Exhibitions

See also 
 The Associated Press
 Euromaidan
 Serhii Korovayny

References

Literature cited

External links 

 Mstyslav Chernov's personal webpage
 Mstyslav Chernov's page on UnFrame
 Mstyslav Chernov's page on UAPF website
 Mstyslav Chernov's page in Instagram

Living people
Ukrainian journalists
Associated Press reporters
Ukrainian photographers
Associated Press photographers
Artists from Kharkiv
1985 births
War correspondents
Writers from Kharkiv
Film people from Kharkiv
Ukrainian writers
Ukrainian novelists